Oliver Ralph Kebble (born 18 June 1992) is a Scotland international rugby union player, currently playing for Glasgow Warriors in the Pro14. He previously played Super Rugby with the Stormers and Currie Cup rugby with Western Province. His regular position is prop.

Rugby Union career

Amateur career

Kebble was drafted to Marr in the Scottish Premiership for the 2017-18 season.

Kebble has been drafted to Currie in the Scottish Premiership for the 2018-19 season.

Professional career

Kebble was part of the London Irish academy, before joining French Pro D2 side Mont-de-Marsan.

In 2012, Kebble returned to South Africa and joined Western Province. He played for the Western Province U21 side in 2012, as well as in 2013, when Western Province won the Under-21 Provincial Championship competition in the latter season.

Kebble made his debut for the Western Province senior team during the 2012 Vodacom Cup competition, coming on as a substitute against the SWD Eagles at Outeniqua Park.

In 2014, Kebble was named in the Stormers pre-season training squad and was later included in the final squad.

On 15 February 2017, Kebble journeys to Scotland to sign for Glasgow Warriors in the Pro14 from the 2017-18 season.

International career

In 2012, Kebble was part of the South Africa Under-20 side that won the 2012 IRB Junior World Championship held in South Africa. He made a substitute appearances in their opening match against Ireland and started the other pool matches against Italy and England. He also came on as a substitute in the semi-final against Argentina, but was an unused substitute in the final against New Zealand.

Kebble made his international debut for Scotland against Georgia on 23 October 2020.

Personal life

Kebble did his A-levels at Dulwich College in London, England. He is the son of Guy Kebble, a rugby union prop who played in four test matches for the Springboks during the 1993 South Africa rugby union tour of Argentina and the 1994 South Africa rugby union tour of New Zealand. He is the nephew of controversial late mining magnate Brett Kebble.

Whilst at the Stormers academy, Kebble shared a flat with Huw Jones his former team mate at Glasgow Warriors. To supplement their income Kebble worked managing an office of a security firm and Jones worked in a bar.

References

1992 births
Living people
Currie RFC players
Glasgow Warriors players
Marr RFC players
Rugby union players from Durban
Rugby union props
Scotland international rugby union players
Scottish rugby union players
South Africa Under-20 international rugby union players
South African rugby union players
Stormers players
Western Province (rugby union) players